William Anderson (1746-1830) was a bookseller in Stirling, Scotland. He was born as one of three triplets: two boys and a girl all of whom survived into old age. He was elected Provost of Stirling five times in the years 1793, 1794, 1813, 1814, and 1829. He is reported to have had a very lavish funeral which was his long-standing ambition. An engraving was made by William Ward of his portrait which was painted by Andrew Geddes. After his retiral a guilded copy of the engraving is said to have hung in his former bookstore. The British Museum hold a copy of the print. Anderson served for many years as a Justice of the Peace.

Namesake
There is another Provost Anderson (Robert) who traded with James Johnston of Stirling, a timber merchant under the name of Johnston and Anderson.

References

Sources

Stirling (city)
Scottish booksellers
1746 births
1830 deaths